Abu Dhabi Global Market Square Tower 1 (Al Sila Tower), formerly Sowwah Square Tower 1, is the name of a skyscraper on Al Maryah Island in Abu Dhabi, the capital of the United Arab Emirates.

The building is located in the district of the Abu Dhabi Global Market Square and opened in 2011. Al Sila Tower is 184 meters (604 feet) tall with 37 floors.

The tower holds 40,400 square metres of office space which has been rented out to companies such as Gulf Capital, Abu Dhabi Finance, Booze and Company and others.

See also
 Sowwah Square Tower 2
 Sowwah Square Tower 3
 Sowwah Square Tower 4
 List of tallest buildings in Abu Dhabi

References

2008 establishments in the United Arab Emirates 
Buildings and structures completed in 2011 
Skyscraper office buildings in Abu Dhabi